Albert Ernest Thomas (10 March 1872 – 25 May 1923) was a member of the Legislative Assembly of Western Australia from 1901 to 1905, representing the seat of Dundas.

Thomas was born in Camborne, Cornwall, England, to Charlotte Augusta (née Dunstan) and Joseph Thomas. He attended the Camborne School of Mines, and afterward worked as a mining engineer in Cornwall, Wales, and South Africa. Thomas came to Western Australia in 1896, and subsequently managed mines in Norseman and Coolgardie. He entered parliament at the 1901 state election, winning the seat of Dundas, and was re-elected at the 1904 election. At the early 1905 election, however, he was defeated by a Labor candidate, Charles Hudson. Thomas recontested Dundas at the 1908 election, but again lost to Hudson. He returned to Cornwall in 1910, and died there in 1923, aged 51.

References

1872 births
1923 deaths
British mining engineers
Australian people of Cornish descent
British emigrants to Australia
Members of the Western Australian Legislative Assembly
People from Camborne